The Outback Highway (possibly also known as Barndioota Road) is the road from Hawker along the western side of the Flinders Ranges through Leigh Creek to Marree. It is designated as part of route B83 from Hawker to Lyndhurst. Route B83 continues south from Hawker along the Flinders Ranges Way.

Major intersections

References

Highways in South Australia
Flinders Ranges
Far North (South Australia)